Stylidium section Uniflora is a taxonomic rank under Stylidium subgenus Andersonia. In 2000, A.R. Bean published a taxonomic revision of subgenus Andersonia and established this section to separate these five species based on morphological and cladistic analysis.

As the section epithet suggests, the most striking feature of the species in this taxonomic group are the solitary flowers on the scapes, a departure from the traditional form of most Stylidium species which have more than one flower per scape. Distribution is primarily in tropical Australia with one species, S. pedunculatum also being found on the Aru Islands.

See also
 List of Stylidium species

References

Stylidium
Plant sections